In bioinformatics, the root-mean-square deviation of atomic positions, or simply root-mean-square deviation (RMSD), is the measure of the average distance between the atoms (usually the backbone atoms) of superimposed proteins. Note that RMSD calculation can be applied to other, non-protein molecules, such as small organic molecules. In the study of globular protein conformations, one customarily measures the similarity in three-dimensional structure by the RMSD of the Cα atomic coordinates after optimal rigid body superposition.

When a dynamical system fluctuates about some well-defined average position, the RMSD from the average over time can be referred to as the RMSF or root mean square fluctuation. The size of this fluctuation can be measured, for example using Mössbauer spectroscopy or nuclear magnetic resonance, and can provide important physical information. The Lindemann index is a method of placing the RMSF in the context of the parameters of the system.

A widely used way to compare the structures of biomolecules or solid bodies is to translate and rotate one structure with respect to the other to minimize the RMSD. Coutsias, et al. presented a simple derivation, based on quaternions, for the optimal solid body transformation (rotation-translation) that minimizes the RMSD between two sets of vectors. They proved that the quaternion method is equivalent to the well-known Kabsch algorithm. The solution given by Kabsch is an instance of the solution of the d-dimensional problem, introduced by Hurley and Cattell. The quaternion solution to compute the optimal rotation was published in the appendix of a paper of Petitjean. This quaternion solution and the calculation of the optimal isometry in the d-dimensional case were both extended to infinite sets and to the continuous case in the appendix A of another paper of Petitjean.

The equation

 

where δi is the distance between atom i and either a reference structure or the mean position of the N equivalent atoms.  This is often calculated for the backbone heavy atoms C, N, O, and Cα or sometimes just the Cα atoms.

Normally a rigid superposition which minimizes the RMSD is performed, and this minimum is returned.

 

A RMSD value is expressed in length units. The most commonly used unit in structural biology is the Ångström (Å) which is equal to 10−10 m.

Uses
Typically RMSD is used as a quantitative measure of similarity between two or more protein structures. For example, the CASP protein structure prediction competition uses RMSD as one of its assessments of how well a submitted structure matches the known, target structure. Thus the lower RMSD, the better the model is in comparison to the target structure.

Also some scientists who study protein folding by computer simulations use RMSD as a reaction coordinate to quantify where the protein is between the folded state and the unfolded state.

The study of RMSD for small organic molecules (commonly called ligands when they're binding to macromolecules, such as proteins, is studied) is common in the context of docking, as well as in other methods to study the configuration of ligands when bound to macromolecules. Note that, for the case of ligands (contrary to proteins, as described above), their structures are most commonly not superimposed prior to the calculation of the RMSD.

RMSD is also one of several metrics that have been proposed for quantifying evolutionary similarity between proteins, as well as the quality of sequence alignments.

See also
Root mean square deviation
Root mean square fluctuation
Quaternion – used to optimise RMSD calculations
Kabsch algorithm – an algorithm used to minimize the RMSD by first finding the best rotation
GDT – a different structure comparison measure
TM-score – a different structure comparison measure
Longest continuous segment (LCS) — A different structure comparison measure
Global distance calculation (GDC_sc, GDC_all) — Structure comparison measures that use full-model information (not just α-carbon) to assess similarity
Local global alignment (LGA) — Protein structure alignment program and structure comparison measure

References

Further reading
 Shibuya T (2009). "Searching Protein 3-D Structures in Linear Time." Proc. 13th Annual International Conference on Research in Computational Molecular Biology (RECOMB 2009), LNCS 5541:1–15.

External links
 Molecular Distance Measures—a tutorial on how to calculate RMSD
 RMSD—another tutorial on how to calculate RMSD with example code
Secondary Structure Matching (SSM) — a tool for protein structure comparison. Uses RMSD.
 GDT, LCS and LGA — different structure comparison measures. Description and services.
SuperPose — a protein superposition server. Uses RMSD.
superpose — structural alignment based on secondary structure matching. By the CCP4 project. Uses RMSD.
A Python script is available at https://github.com/charnley/rmsd
An alternate Python script is available at https://github.com/jewettaij/superpose3d

Statistical deviation and dispersion
Protein methods
Bioinformatics